Sincheon station may refer to several railway stations in South Korea:

Sincheon station (Daegu Metro), on Daegu Subway Line 1 in Sincheon-dong.
Sincheon station (Siheung), on the Seohae Line.
Jamsilsaenae Station, on Seoul Subway Line 2 in Jamsil-dong, Songpa-gu.

See also
Sinchon station, on Seoul Subway Line 2 in Mapo-gu, South Korea.
Sinchon Station (Unnyul Line), in Sinch'ŏn-up, South Hwanghae Province, North Korea.